Nazi chic is the use of style, imagery, and paraphernalia in clothing and popular culture related to Nazi-era Germany, especially when used for taboo-breaking or shock value rather than out of genuine sympathies with Nazism or Nazi ideology.

Its popularity began in the 1970s with the emergence of the punk and glam rock movements: the Sex Pistols' first television appearance occurred with a person of their entourage wearing a swastika. Nazi chic was later used in the fashion industry. The trend, while having originated in the Western culture, by the late 20th and early 21st century became particularly popular in Asia.

Europe and United States
In the surf culture of the 1950s and 1960s, "Surf Nazis" would experiment with Nazi aesthetics, such as swastikas and Nazi helmets, and sometimes paint swastikas on their cars. Their motivation was often anti-establishment rebelliousness, rather than genuine sympathy with the Nazis. American artist Ed Roth sold plastic Nazi stormtrooper helmets to surfers in the 1960s, and told Time magazine, “That Hitler really did a helluva public relations job for me.” In the 1960s, some filmmakers looking for edgy and controversial ideas incorporated Nazi themes into their works for shock value, with the 1965 film Censored described as having "the dubious honour of being the very first skinflick to mix Nazis and naked women" 

In the early 1970s, glam rock acts incorporated nazi symbolism into their works, often for the shock value and outrageousness. Steve Priest, of the glam rock band The Sweet, wore a nazi uniform and fake toothbrush moustache in a December 1973 live performance of "Block Buster!", on Top of the Pops. In the 1970s punk subculture, several items of clothing designed to shock and offend the Establishment became popular. Among these punk fashion items was a T-shirt displaying a Swastika, an upside-down crucifix and the word DESTROY– which was worn by Johnny Rotten of the Sex Pistols, seen in the video for "Pretty Vacant". Rotten wore the swastika another time with a gesture that looked like a Nazi salute. In 1976, Siouxsie Sioux of Siouxsie and the Banshees was also known to wear a Swastika armband with fetish S and M clothing, including fishnets and a whip. These musicians are commonly thought to have worn such clothing for shock value directed towards the British WWII generation rather than being genuinely associated with any National Socialist or fascist ideologies, and those with such interests likely became part of the Nazi punk or white power skinhead subcultures.

In 1984, two T-shirt designs featuring Adolf Hitler were produced in West Germany. The more famous of the two was the "Adolf Hitler European Tour" design, which featured a picture of Hitler against the backdrop of a map of Europe, with conquered territories shaded; and tour dates given as:
September 1939 Poland
April 1940 Norway
May 1940 Luxembourg
May 1940 Holland
May 1940 Belgium
June 1940 France
September 1940 England Cancelled
April 1941 Jugoslavia
May 1941 Greece
June 1941 Crete
August 1942 Russia Cancelled
July 1945 Berlin Bunker.

A less popular T-shirt featured Hitler giving the Roman salute, and a yo-yo hanging from his hand. The text read "European yo-yo champion 1939-1945". Sale of the apparel led to a legal case in Germany, in an attempt to have it banned as "glorifying genocide". In 1988, Ralph Engelstad was criticized for a party he held at his Imperial Palace hotel-casino in Las Vegas featuring bartenders wearing the "European Tour" shirts. In 1990, the ACLU represented a high school student on Long Island who was told to remove the shirt or face suspension by school officials who claimed the shirt was anti-semitic.

In an interview with Welt am Sonntag, Bryan Ferry, the English singer and musician, acknowledged that he calls his studio in west London his "Führerbunker". He was quoted as saying, "My God, the Nazis knew how to put themselves in the limelight and present themselves. ... Leni Riefenstahl's movies and Albert Speer's buildings and the mass parades and the flags - just amazing. Really beautiful." 

English heavy metal and rock and roll musician Lemmy of the band Motörhead collected Nazi memorabilia and had an Iron Cross on his bass guitar, but stated that he collected these memorabilia for aesthetic values only, and considered himself an anarchist or libertarian and actually despised Nazi Regime's ideologies and their subsequent actions.

In early 2005, a designer using the pseudonym "Helmut Doork" began marketing a parody souvenir T-shirt with the slogans "My grandparents went to Auschwitz and all I got was this lousy t-shirt!" and "Arbeit Macht Frei."  In response to a complaint from the Anti-Defamation League, the design was removed from CafePress' website in late 2006.
The creator later uploaded it to Printfection.  After Printfection removed it without explanation the creator then released it into the public domain, giving anyone permission to print and/or commercialize the design without permission.

Prince Harry was criticized for wearing a costume with a swastika armband causing considerable embarrassment to his family. Harry's impromptu costume resembled the Afrika Korps, rather than more political units such as the SS. Writer Moyra Bremner commented on BBC News 24 that no one had stopped the prince wearing the costume.

Alternative hip hop group OFWGKTA uses the swastika symbol and makes references to Nazism in its lyrics.

Nazi chic fashion can be seen in the music videos for Madonna's "Justify My Love" (1990), Marilyn Manson's "The Fight Song" (2001) and Lady Gaga's "LoveGame" (2009).

In Turkey, Hitler's book Mein Kampf became a best-seller in early 2005 following price cuts and rising Turkish nationalism.

Asia 

In Japan, World War II is not taught in schools as a battle of political ideologies, but as a conventional war. This type of education treats Hitler and the Nazi Party as charismatic and powerful leaders of countries during wartime, instead of war criminals as elsewhere. Uniforms and other imagery related to Nazi Germany are sold in East and South East Asia, where some consider it fashionable. Pop groups have dressed in SS-inspired uniforms.

Sometimes in East Asia, for example China and Japan, Nazi uniforms are used as part of cosplay. Several Japanese products have reused Nazi themes in their artwork, such as the 2010 card game Barbarossa, described as the "softcore Nazi anime porn" with "anime Nazi girls". The game was successful enough to receive an English release in 2013 as well as an stand-alone sequel El Alamein (also released in English). 2019 saw the release of video game Mein Waifu is the Fuhrer, described as a "Nazi-themed anime dating simulator" and inspired by the Japanese art and the visual novel-type of game, whose original trailer was taken down from YouTube for alleged hate speech.

It has been suggested that Neo-Nazis and members of Alt-Right groups have a preference for anime-style avatars, partially due to many younger Neo-Nazis getting their start on imageboards such as 4chan and 8chan, which are also home to large sub-boards for anime discussion. 

In South Korea, an area generally isolated from Nazi cultural influences during the Nazi era, Time magazine observed in 2000 "an unthinking fascination with the icons and imagery of the Third Reich." 

In Indonesia, the SoldatenKaffee, a café featuring Nazi decoration and memorabilia closed in 2013 due to controversies and critiques by international media as well as death threats and hate mail to the owners. The SoldatenKaffee, however, reopened in 2014, the owner claimed that his establishment was never aimed to promote Nazi ideology explaining that Nazism was only seen from a historical perspective in Indonesia.  The SoldatenKaffee closed again in 2017 due to moving elsewhere for lack of local demand. 

There is an ongoing interest in Thailand in Nazi symbolism, particularly among young people. The fascination with such imagery is considered to be based on a lack of understanding of the Holocaust rather than political leanings or hate crime. A Nazi-themed restaurant in Bangkok was opened in 2013 called Hitler Fried Chicken.

George Burdi, the former head of the Neo-Nazi record label Resistance Records, claimed to have sold many CDs to Japan, because some Japanese believe themselves to be the master race of the East. 

In 2006, a restaurant named Hitler's Cross was opened in Mumbai, India. It was later renamed after protests by the Indian Jewish community. 'Nazi Collection' Bedspread  was launched, by a Mumbai-based home furnishing company in 2007. In 2007, in Gujarat a men's clothing store named Hitler was in the news. After the outrage owners claimed they did not know Adolf Hitler. In 2011, a pool parlour named Hitler's Den was opened in Nagpur. It included the Nazi Swastika and insignia. The Israeli embassy in India expressed displeasure with the naming. Simon Wiesenthal Center, an international Jewish human rights organisation called for the parlour to be renamed but the owners of the establishment refused to rename it.

A clothing store in Karachi, Pakistan called "Hitler Reloaded" is named after Hitler.

A clothing store in Gaza is named after Hitler.

See also 

Communist chic
Che Guevara in fashion
Jihad Cool
List of chics
Nazi exploitation
:Category:Nazi exploitation films
Stalag fiction, Israeli pornography
Thor Steinar
Toothbrush moustache
Uniform fetishism

References 

Fashion aesthetics
Neo-Nazi concepts
Clothing controversies
German fashion